The Wadi El Harrach is an Algerian river that originates in the Bliden, Atlas Mountains near Hammam Melouane.

Oued El Harrach crosses the Mitidja plain from Bougara and irrigates agricultural areas all around, thanks in particular to its tributaries and canals, Oued Djemâa, Oued Baba Ali, Oued El Terro and Wadi Semar which crosses an industrial zone Of the eastern suburbs of Algiers.

Its main tributary is the Oued El Kerma which increases the volume of the river thanks to the waters descended from the Algerian sahel.

The river flows through  of Industrial Area, in Algiers, and so is now very polluted. Pollution in the river now threatens the bay of Algiers, since in 2005 a study conducted by the Japanese researcher Mitsuo Yoshida discovered lead, chlorine, zinc and chromium in large quantities discharged into the sea.

See also
 Massacre of El Ouffia (6 April 1832)

References

External links

Harrach
Bodies of water of Algeria
Landforms of Algeria